Depressaria irregularis is a moth of the family Depressariidae. It is found in Japan and the Russian Far East.

References

Moths described in 1931
Depressaria
Moths of Japan
Moths of Asia